Vitaly Mykolayovych Kononov (born 2 April 1950) is a Ukrainian politician.

Political career
Kononov was a candidate in the 2004 Ukrainian presidential election, nominated by the Green Party of Ukraine, which he then chaired. He was a national deputy of Ukraine, and been concerned with issues such as youth politics, physical training and sport. Since 1999, he has been a member of the Board of Ukrainian-wide union of democratic forces "Consent". He was also a presidential candidate in 1999, receiving 0.29% of the votes and finished 11th of 13 candidates.

In his election program, Kononov supports transition to parliamentary-presidential government, and he actively speaks in support of environment protection.

References

1950 births
Living people
People from Kobuleti
Party of Greens of Ukraine politicians
Ukrainian people of Georgian descent
Candidates in the 1999 Ukrainian presidential election
Candidates in the 2004 Ukrainian presidential election
Kyiv Polytechnic Institute alumni